The Foreign Agricultural Service (FAS) is the foreign affairs agency with primary responsibility for the United States Department of Agriculture's (USDA) overseas programs – market development, international trade agreements and negotiations, and the collection of statistics and market information. It also administers the USDA's export credit guarantee and food aid programs and helps increase income and food availability in developing nations by mobilizing expertise for agriculturally led economic growth. The FAS mission statement reads, "Linking U.S. agriculture to the world to enhance export opportunities and global food security," and its motto is "Linking U.S. Agriculture to the World."

Roots in analysis
USDA posted its first employee abroad in 1882, with assignment of Edmund Moffat to London. In 1894, USDA created a Section of Foreign Markets in its Division of Statistics, which by 1901 numbered seven employees.  It was succeeded over the next few decades by increasingly larger units. Creation of this series of units in Washington to analyze foreign competition and demand for agricultural commodities was paralleled by assignment abroad of agricultural statistical agents, commodity specialists, and "agricultural commissioners".

Moffat went out as a "statistical agent" of USDA's Division of Statistics but with the status of Deputy Consul General on the roster of the Department of State at London. Subsequent USDA officials assigned overseas, however, did not enjoy diplomatic or consular status. This impeded their work, which at that point consisted mainly of collecting, analyzing, and transmitting to Washington time-sensitive market information on agricultural commodities.

 The analytical unit in Washington, by the early 1920s supervised by Leon Estabrook, deputy chief of USDA's Bureau of Agricultural Economics, compiled publications based on reports from the USDA's overseas staff, U.S. consuls abroad, and data collected by the Rome-based International Institute of Agriculture.

In 1924, USDA officials Nils Olsen and Louis Guy Michael and Congressman John Ketcham began drafting legislation to create an agricultural attaché service with diplomatic status. The legislation passed the House multiple times, but it did not pass the Senate until 1930, in part due to opposition from then-Commerce Secretary Herbert Hoover. Hoover, however, eventually supported the legislation to garner support of the farm bloc during his presidential campaign. Accordingly, the Foreign Agricultural Service was created by the Foreign Agricultural Service Act of 1930 (46 Stat. 497), which President Herbert Hoover signed into law on June 5, 1930.

The law stipulated that the FAS consist of overseas USDA officials. The USDA also created a Foreign Agricultural Service Division within the Bureau of Agricultural Economics to serve as the FAS's headquarters staff in Washington, D.C., naming Asher Hobson, a noted economist and political scientist, as its first head. The 1930 Act explicitly granted the USDA's overseas officials diplomatic status and the right to the diplomatic title attaché. In short order, FAS posted additional staff overseas, to Marseille, Pretoria, Belgrade, Sydney, and Kobe, in addition to existing staff in London, Buenos Aires, Berlin, and Shanghai. In Washington, Hobson hired Lazar Volin, a Russian émigré, as the agency's first D.C.-based regional analyst, to specialize in the study of Russia as a competitor to U.S. agriculture.

International trade policy

In 1934, Congress passed the Reciprocal Trade Agreements Act, which stipulated that the President must consult with the Secretary of Agriculture when negotiating tariff reductions for agricultural commodities. Secretary of Agriculture Henry A. Wallace delegated this responsibility to the Foreign Agricultural Service Division, and thus began the FAS's role in formulation and implementation of international trade policy. The FAS led agricultural tariff negotiations, first concluding a new tariff agreement with Cuba, followed by Belgium, Haiti, Sweden, Brazil and Colombia. By 1939, new agricultural tariffs were in place with 20 countries, including the United Kingdom, the United States' largest agricultural trading partner.

This new responsibility spurred a change in field reporting from overseas offices. To negotiate tariff agreements, the FAS needed comprehensive information on the domestic agricultural policies of trading partners, and the primary source of this information was the agency's field offices abroad. Thus, in addition to traditional commodity reporting, the attachés and commissioners were called on to add policy analysis to their portfolios.

On December 1, 1938, the Foreign Agricultural Service Division was upgraded, made directly subordinate to the Secretary, and renamed simply the Foreign Agricultural Service. On July 1, 1939, however, President Franklin D. Roosevelt ordered all diplomatic personnel, including the agricultural attachés and commissioners, transferred to the Department of State. The Foreign Agricultural Service was abolished, and its headquarters staff was renamed the Office of Foreign Agricultural Relations (OFAR). At that time the Director of Foreign Agricultural Relations, Leslie A. Wheeler, was appointed by executive order to the Board of the Foreign Service and the Board of Examiners, an acknowledgement of OFAR's status as a foreign affairs agency.

Office of Foreign Agricultural Relations

OFAR began handling food aid in 1941 when President Roosevelt and the Congress authorized $1.35 billion of food assistance to Great Britain. During this period OFAR also led negotiations that resulted in creation of the International Wheat Council, and began assisting Latin American countries to develop their agriculture. This latter effort was related to the need for strategic commodities as World War II loomed, as well as the need to tie South America closer to the Allies and thereby to keep Nazi Germany from gaining a foothold in the New World. During World War II, OFAR analyzed food availability in both allied and enemy countries, and promoted the stockpiling of 100 million bushels (2.7 million metric tons) of wheat for feeding refugees after the anticipated end of the war.  

After the war OFAR was instrumental in carrying out land reform in Japan and offering agricultural technical assistance under the Marshall Plan and the Point Four Program. By 1953, OFAR had roughly 400 agricultural specialists working on development programs in 27 foreign countries. OFAR also continued food aid programs, particularly using the Agricultural Act of 1949's authorities to donate surplus commodities. The intent of these efforts was first, to combat communism; second, to promote export sales of U.S. agricultural products; and third, to improve diets in foreign countries through extension of technical assistance and technology transfer.

At this point OFAR directed the work of overseas technical assistance programs while the Department of State directed the work of the agricultural attachés. Frictions began to develop as the Department of State began to deny USDA requests for information from the attachés, leading to pressure from both agricultural producer groups and influential congressmen for the attachés to be returned to USDA control.

OFAR participated actively with the Department of State in negotiating the General Agreement on Tariffs and Trade (GATT), signed in 1947 and expanded through subsequent negotiation rounds, although agriculture was not a major focus until the Uruguay Round of negotiations. At the same time, OFAR was heavily involved in founding the UN Food and Agriculture Organization, with Director of Foreign Agricultural Relations Leslie A. Wheeler playing a particularly instrumental role.

FAS is reconstituted
On March 10, 1953, Secretary of Agriculture Ezra Taft Benson abolished OFAR and reconstituted the Foreign Agricultural Service. In April 1954, FAS handed off national security–related technical assistance to the International Cooperation Administration (USAID's forerunner) and began to concentrate on foreign market development for U.S. agricultural commodities, signaling a radical shift in the agency's focus. On September 1, 1954, following passage of H.R. 8033 (P.L. 83-690), the agricultural attachés were transferred back from State Department to FAS.

In the same year, Congress passed Public Law 480 (P.L. 83-480), the Food for Peace Act, which became the backbone of FAS's food aid and market development efforts. Agricultural attachés began negotiating agreements for concessional sale of U.S. farm commodities to foreign countries on terms of up to 30 years and in their own local currencies.  The Act was uncommon in that it allowed for the agreements made by the FAS to bypass the normal advice and consent of the U.S. Senate.

In 1955, FAS began signing cooperative agreements with groups representing American producers of specific commodities to expand foreign demand. The first such agreement was signed with the National Cotton Council. This activity came to be called the Market Development Cooperator Program, and the groups themselves to be called "cooperators".

In 1961, the General Sales Manager of USDA's Commodity Stabilization Service (CSS) and his staff were merged into FAS, bringing with them operational responsibility for export credit and food aid programs. In particular, the General Sales Manager was responsible for setting prices for export sale of USDA-owned surplus commodities that had been acquired through domestic farm support programs. At the same time, the CSS Barter and Stockpiling Manager was also moved to FAS. In the postwar era USDA's Commodity Credit Corporation was heavily involved in efforts to barter CCC-owned commodities acquired via domestic farm support programs for strategic commodities available from foreign countries short of hard currency. By the mid-1960s, however, as European and Asian economies recovered, the emphasis on barter waned.

In 1969, the General Sales Manager and his staff were split off to form a separate USDA agency, the Export Marketing Service (EMS). In 1974, however, EMS was re-merged with FAS. In 1977, under pressure from the Congress, the Carter Administration created an "Office of the General Sales Manager" nominally headed by the General Sales Manager, but in reality still a subunit of FAS and subordinate to the FAS Administrator. In 1981 the Ronald Reagan Administration abolished the Office of the General Sales Manager and formally restored its status as a program area of FAS. During that time, the GSM's responsibilities expanded from mere disposition of surplus commodities to management of commodity export credit guarantee programs, foreign food assistance programs, and direct credit programs.

The Foreign Agricultural Service, a foreign affairs agency since 1930, was included in the Foreign Service Act of 1980. Agricultural attachés were offered the choice of remaining civil servants or being grandfathered into the Foreign Service. Since that time the vast majority of agricultural officers overseas, just like State Department officials overseas, have been Foreign Service Officers. Since 1953, 12 former agricultural attachés have been confirmed as American Ambassadors.

Major events
Trade tensions with the European Economic Community (EEC) boiled over in 1962 with the first "Chicken War", a trade dispute arising from the EEC's application of protective tariffs on poultry meat imported from the United States in retaliation for President Kennedy's imposition of a ceiling on textile imports and raising of tariffs on carpets, glass and bicycles. FAS negotiators and analysts, including future Administrator Rolland "Bud" Anderson, supported talks that resulted in the EEC paying $26 million in damages, though in Anderson's words, "We won the battle but lost the war as U.S. exports of these products to Europe soon became insignificant". The so-called "Chicken War" was a precursor to numerous other trade disputes, including the 2002 "Poultry War", when Russia retaliated against the United States' steel tariffs by barring imports of U.S. poultry meat, and the dispute over the European Union's ban on imports of U.S. beef produced from cattle treated with growth promotants.

In 1972 a short grain crop in the USSR resulted in the Soviet Union quietly concluding grain purchasing contracts from a relatively small number of the secretive private multinational grain traders who dominated world trade in cereals. Because crop surveys in mid-spring had given the impression of a normal crop, FAS's agricultural attaché in Moscow chose not to follow up with additional crop observation travel, and thus missed a severe drought that set in after the last trip. As a result of this lapse, international grain traders and exporting nations were unaware of the Soviets' dire need for massive grain imports. By the time the scope of Soviet purchases became known, the USSR had locked in supplies at low, subsidized prices, leaving other importers and consumers scrambling for what was left at significantly higher prices. This event, known as the "Great grain robbery", led to creation in the Foreign Agricultural Service of a satellite imagery unit for remote sensing of foreign crop conditions, negotiation of a long-term grain agreement (LTA) with the Soviet Union, and imposition of an export sales reporting requirement for U.S. grain exporters. It also impressed on FAS the need for "boots-on-the-ground" observation of crop conditions in critical countries.

In the 1980s, the European Economic Community (EEC) emerged as a competitor for export sales, particularly of grain. EEC export restitutions (subsidies) undercut U.S. sales, with the result that farm-state Members of Congress, led by Senator Bob Dole of Kansas, pushed through new legislation authorizing broader subsidization of commercial export sales. This Export Enhancement Program (or EEP, though it was originally called "BICEP" by Senator Dole) was used primarily to counter EEC subsidies in important markets. Use of EEP opened the United States to criticism from less developed countries on the grounds that export subsidies undercut their own farmers by depressing global commodity prices. By the mid-1990s EEP was largely abandoned in favor of negotiating for a multilateral ban on agricultural export subsidies; it was last used, for a single sale, during the Clinton administration. With founding of the World Trade Organization in January 1995, trade-distorting domestic agricultural supports were capped in all member states and absolute import quotas were banned, but negotiations on eliminating export subsidies continue still.

Food aid
FAS has managed food assistance programs since 1941, and today uses a mix of statutory authorities. The traditional programs are Section 416(b) of the Agricultural Act of 1949, which makes surplus commodities available for donation overseas, and Title I of Public Law 480 (Food for Peace), which authorizes concessional sales. These programs were designed to support government-to-government transactions. The 1985 Farm Bill created the Food for Progress program, which facilitated delivery of food aid through non-governmental organizations as well as foreign governments. Food for Progress can draw on multiple sources, including in-kind surplus commodities and appropriated funds.

The most recent addition to the array of FAS-implemented food aid programs is the McGovern/Dole International Food for Education and Child Nutrition Program. Named in honor of Senator Dole and Senator George McGovern, it supports school feeding programs in less developed countries, and reserves authority for supporting maternal and child health programs. It was authorized by the 2002 Farm Bill and reauthorized in 2008. Funding sources have varied since the pilot Global Food for Education program was deployed in fiscal year 2001, often combining both appropriated funds and funding from the Commodity Credit Corporation’s borrowing authority.

International development and national security

After a nine-year hiatus from international agricultural development work at USDA, on July 12, 1963, Secretary Orville Freeman ordered creation of an International Agricultural Development Service (IADS), which was subordinate to the same Assistant Secretary of Agriculture as but separate from FAS. IADS served as USDA's liaison with USAID and other assistance organizations, linking them to USDA expertise in pursuit of developmental goals. Matthew Drosdoff was hired effective February 19, 1964, to be the first permanent Administrator of IADS. In March 1969, after the Richard Nixon Administration came to power, IADS was briefly merged into FAS, then in November 1969 was split out into a separate Foreign Economic Development Service (FEDS). On February 6, 1972, FEDS was abolished and its functions transferred to the Economic Research Service, where it became the Foreign Development Division.

In 1977, Quentin West proposed consolidating three USDA units involved in technical assistance and development work into a single agency to be called the Office of International Cooperation and Development: the Foreign Development Division, the Science and Education Administration, an interagency consortium funded by foreign currency earnings, and FAS' International Organization Affairs Staff. West's proposal was accepted and thus OICD was created, with responsibility for technical assistance, training, foreign currency-funded research, and international organization liaison. In 1994, USDA's Office of International Cooperation and Development was merged with FAS, bringing technical assistance back to FAS after a 40-year absence.

In 2003, FAS posted agricultural officers to Baghdad, not for the by-then traditional purposes of market intelligence and market development, but to reconstruct the Iraqi Ministry of Agriculture. FAS also began organizing USDA contributions to Provincial Reconstruction Teams in Iraq and Afghanistan. This marked FAS' return to national security work. Then-Secretary of Agriculture Tom Vilsack pledged to continue and to expand that work. FAS' role in national security work, however, remains controversial.

Heads of Service and Ambassadors

Heads of Service
From 1930 to about 1934, division heads in USDA, including the heads of the Foreign Agricultural Service Division, had no formal title, but were referred to as "In-charge", though the Official Register of the United States Government listed them as "Chief". Beginning around 1934 and until 1938, the head of FASD was called the "Chief". When FAS was renamed in 1938, the head was titled "Director", and that title carried over into OFAR and then the renewed FAS until 1954. The first head of FAS to bear the title "Administrator" was William Lodwick in that year. Heads of the Foreign Agricultural Service and Office of Foreign Agricultural Relations since 1930 have been (periods as acting head are in italics):

General Sales Managers
General Sales Managers since 1955 have been (periods as acting GSM are in italics):

Heads of International Development
Administrators of the Office of International Cooperation and Development and its predecessors from creation until it was merged with FAS in 1994 were (periods as acting Administrator are in italics):

Ambassadors
Agricultural officers who have served or are serving as Ambassadors are:

See also
Agricultural attaché
Agricultural Trade Act of 1978
Canadian Caper
Chief Agricultural Negotiator
Commissioner
Commodity Credit Corporation
Dennis A. FitzGerald
Foreign Agricultural Trade System of the United States
Foreign Market Development Program
Iowa Hog Lift
Leslie A. Wheeler
Market Access Program
Stanley Andrews
Targeted Export Assistance Program
Under Secretary of Agriculture for Farm and Foreign Agricultural Services
Unified Export Strategy
United States Department of Agriculture
United States Foreign Service
Wolf Ladejinsky

References

Bibliography

Further reading

U.S. government websites

Statutes
  Chapter 35A contains Section 416of the Agricultural Act of 1949 (7 U.S.C. 1431), the surplus disposal authority making Commodity Credit Corporation-owned commodities available for donation to foreign beneficiaries.
  Chapter 41 includes the Food for Peace Act (7 U.S.C. 1691 et seq.), Food for Progress Act of 1985 (7 U.S.C. 1736o), McGovern-Dole Food for Education Program (7 U.S.C. 1736o–1), Local and Regional Procurement Program (7 U.S.C. 1726c), Bill Emerson Humanitarian Trust Act (7 U.S.C. 1736f–1).
  
 
  
  Basic authority for the Foreign Agricultural Service resides in Subchapter V: Foreign Agricultural Service (7USC5692-5695).
  Cochran Fellowship Program authority
  (President must seek advice of Secretary of Agriculture before signing any trade agreement)

Federal Regulations

Departmental Regulations

USDA Regulations

Foreign Affairs Manual

Other

Other publications and documents 

 
 
 
 
 
 
 
 
 
 
 
 
 
 
 
 
   
 
 
 
  (see page 10 for report of posting to London of Edmund Moffat)

Oral Histories On Line
  (use the search engine for a "Full Text" search on "Foreign Agricultural Service" in quotes)

Media Articles (chronological order)

External links
 
 Foreign Agricultural Service in the Federal Register

 
Agricultural economics
United States
Export credit agencies
Foreign relations of the United States
Foreign trade of the United States
United States Department of Agriculture agencies
United States trade policy
Foreign relations agencies of the United States
Agricultural marketing
Agricultural marketing in the United States